Stef Marinus Wijlaars (born 19 January 1988) is a Dutch former professional footballer who played as a midfielder.

Career
He previously played for FC Den Bosch, FK Senica and Sigma Olomouc. He retired as part of amateur club Gemert in 2015 due to injuries.

References

External links
 Stef Wijlaars at FK Senica
 

1988 births
Living people
Dutch footballers
Dutch expatriate footballers
Association football midfielders
FC Den Bosch players
FK Senica players
SK Sigma Olomouc players
Eerste Divisie players
Slovak Super Liga players
Czech First League players
Expatriate footballers in Slovakia
Expatriate footballers in the Czech Republic
People from Mierlo
Footballers from North Brabant
Dutch expatriate sportspeople in Slovakia
Dutch expatriate sportspeople in the Czech Republic
21st-century Dutch people